"You're My Driving Wheel" is a dance/disco song by The Supremes. The song was released on September 30, 1976 as the first single from their album Mary, Scherrie & Susaye.  Along with the tracks, "Let Yourself Go" and "Love I Never Knew", "You're My Driving Wheel" peaked at number five on the disco chart.  On the Soul chart, the single peaked at number fifty and number eighty-five on the Hot 100.

Charts

Personnel
 Lead vocals by Scherrie Payne
 Background vocals by Mary Wilson, Scherrie Payne and Susaye Greene

References

1976 singles
The Supremes songs
Motown singles
1976 songs
Songs written by Brian Holland